Robert Alexis Páez Rodriguez (born 1 June 1994 in Cumaná) is a Venezuelan diver. He competed in the 3 m springboard at the 2012 Summer Olympics.

Personal life
On 8 April 2018, Páez came out as gay.

References 

1994 births
Living people
People from Cumaná
Divers at the 2012 Summer Olympics
Divers at the 2016 Summer Olympics
Olympic divers of Venezuela
Venezuelan male divers
LGBT divers
Venezuelan LGBT sportspeople
Gay sportsmen
Divers at the 2010 Summer Youth Olympics
Divers at the 2011 Pan American Games
Divers at the 2015 Pan American Games
Pan American Games competitors for Venezuela
21st-century Venezuelan people